David Rhys Goodfield (born 15 June 1993) is an English field hockey player who plays as a midfielder or forward for Surbiton and the   England and Great Britain national teams.

Club career
He plays club hockey in the Men's England Hockey League for Surbiton.
 
Goodfield joined Surbiton from Harvestehuder THC and has also played for Sheffield Hallam and Telford & Wrekin HC.

International career

References

External links

Profile on England Hockey

1993 births
Living people
English male field hockey players
Expatriate field hockey players
English expatriate sportspeople in Germany
Commonwealth Games medallists in field hockey
Commonwealth Games bronze medallists for England
Surbiton Hockey Club players
Harvestehuder THC players
Men's England Hockey League players
Field hockey players at the 2018 Commonwealth Games
Men's Feldhockey Bundesliga players
2023 Men's FIH Hockey World Cup players
Medallists at the 2018 Commonwealth Games